Franklin's Tower may refer to:

"Franklin's Tower", a song on the Grateful Dead album Blues for Allah
Franklin Towers, a building located in Portland, Maine